Padar may refer to:

Padar tribe, a nomadic Turkic tribe living in Azerbaijan

People
Anita Pádár (born 1979), Hungarian footballer
Gerli Padar (born 1979), Estonian singer
Ildikó Pádár (born 1970), Hungarian team handball player and Olympic medalist
Ivari Padar (born 1965), Estonian politician
Martin Padar (born 1979), Estonian judoka
Tanel Padar (born 1980), Estonian singer

Places
Padar (island), a small island part of Lesser Sunda Islands in Indonesia located within Komodo National Park
Padar, Azerbaijan (disambiguation), several places
Padar (Jammu and Kashmir), a region in Jammu and Kashmir, India
Padar, Rewa, a village in  Madhya Pradesh, India
Padar, Iran, a village in Razavi Khorasan Province, Iran
Padar, Republic of Dagestan, a rural locality in Dagestan, Russia

Estonian-language surnames
Hungarian-language surnames